The Amager Demons are an American football team from Tårnby in Copenhagen, Denmark. The club was founded in 2002 by Ruben Toft Sindal, Morten Teglsbo and Peter Hansen. Amager Demons are members of the Danish American Football Federation (DAFF).

In 2011 Amager Demons competed for the first time in the National Ligaen, the top division of American Football in Denmark. Despite winning only two games, both against Kronborg Knights, the team avoided relegation and won another season in National Ligaen in 2012.

Recent seasons
Recent seasons of the club:

Youth teams
Amager Demons has youth teams for three age groups, Under-19, Under-16 and Under-14.

External links
  Official website
  Official Facebookpage
  Danish American Football Federation official website

References

American football teams in Denmark
American football teams established in 2002
Sports teams in Copenhagen
2002 establishments in Denmark